Latirulus is a genus of sea snails, marine gastropod mollusks in the family Fasciolariidae, the spindle snails, the tulip snails and their allies.

Species
Species within the genus Latirulus include:

 Latirulus craticulatus (Linnaeus, 1758): synonym of Turrilatirus craticulatus)
 Latirulus fasciatus Habe & Okutani, 1968
 Latirulus melvilli]' (Schepman, 1911): synonym of Turrilatirus melvilli Latirulus nagasakiensis (Smith, 1880): synonym of Turrilatirus nagasakiensis (E.A. Smith, 1880)
 Latirulus turrita (Gmelin, 1791): synonym of Turrilatirus turritus'' (Gmelin, 1791)

References

Fasciolariidae